Thomas Goodwin Pinnock (November 1, 1851 – February 16, 1914) was a Massachusetts politician who served as the 33rd  Mayor of Salem, Massachusetts, United States.

Early life
Pinnock, was born in Lowell, Massachusetts to Thomas and Ann (Lewis) Pinnock, on  November 1, 1851.  Pinnock moved to Salem, Massachusetts when he was six years old.

Family life
Pinnock married Emma Augusta Littlefield, on  January 18, 1878,
they had four children, Harold Pinnock, Anson Pinnock, Thomas Wellington Pinnock, Lorna Pinnock.

Footnotes

  

1914 deaths
Mayors of Salem, Massachusetts
Massachusetts Republicans
1851 births
19th-century American politicians